Mardrea Hyman (born 22 December 1972 in Clarendon) is a Jamaican runner who specializes in the 3000 metres steeplechase.

Competition record

Personal bests
800 metres - 1:59.71 min (1998)
1500 metres - 4:05.25 min (2001)
Mile run - 4:33.90 min (2000)
3000 metre steeplechase - 9:27.21 min (2005)

References

1972 births
Living people
Jamaican female long-distance runners
Jamaican female middle-distance runners
Jamaican female steeplechase runners
Athletes (track and field) at the 1998 Commonwealth Games
Athletes (track and field) at the 2000 Summer Olympics
Athletes (track and field) at the 2002 Commonwealth Games
Athletes (track and field) at the 2003 Pan American Games
Athletes (track and field) at the 2006 Commonwealth Games
Olympic athletes of Jamaica
People from Clarendon Parish, Jamaica
Junior college women's track and field athletes in the United States
Pan American Games medalists in athletics (track and field)
Pan American Games bronze medalists for Jamaica
Central American and Caribbean Games gold medalists for Jamaica
Competitors at the 1998 Central American and Caribbean Games
Central American and Caribbean Games medalists in athletics
Competitors at the 2001 Goodwill Games
Medalists at the 2003 Pan American Games
Commonwealth Games competitors for Jamaica
20th-century Jamaican women
21st-century Jamaican women